Oratory is a type of public speaking.

Oratory may also refer to:

 Eloquence, fluent, forcible, elegant, or persuasive speaking
 Rhetoric, the art of discourse

Places
 Oratory (worship), a public or private place of divine worship, akin to a chapel
 The Oratory, Liverpool, a former mortuary chapel in Liverpool, England
 Birmingham Oratory
 London Oratory
 Oxford Oratory
 York Oratory
 Petergate House
 More House
 Saint Joseph's Oratory, Montreal, Canada

Religious orders
 Oratory of the Good Shepherd (Anglican)
 Oratory of Jesus, or "French Oratory" (Roman Catholic)
 Oratory of Saint Philip Neri (Roman Catholic)
 Teologisk Oratorium (Lutheran)

See also 
 Orator (disambiguation)
 Oratorian (disambiguation)
 Oratorio, a type of musical composition
 Oratory School (disambiguation)